Mansurabad (also Romanized as Manşūrābād) is a village in Nujin Rural District, in the Central District of Farashband County, Fars Province, Iran. At the 2006 census, its population was 1,071, in 198 families.

References 

Populated places in Farashband County